The coat of arms of the Republic of Adygea, a federal subject of Russia, was adopted on May 24, 1994. It is registered as №163 in the Heraldic Register of the Russian Federation.

References

Adygea
Adygea
Adygea
Adygea
Adygea
Adygea
Adygea
Adygea
Adygea
Adygea
Adygea